Hennadiy Skidan (born 24 July 1973) is a retired professional Ukrainian football forward.

Along with Oleh Hrytsai, Skidan became the highest scorer when he scored 22 goals for SC Mykolaiv during the 1997–98 Ukrainian First League season.

References

External links

1973 births
Living people
Sportspeople from Simferopol
Ukrainian footballers
Ukrainian Premier League players
Ukrainian First League players
Ukrainian Second League players
FC Dynamo Saky players
SC Tavriya Simferopol players
FC Kryvbas Kryvyi Rih players
MFC Mykolaiv players
FC Karpaty Lviv players
FC Karpaty-2 Lviv players
FC Spartak Ivano-Frankivsk players
FC Polissya Zhytomyr players

Association football forwards